The men's eight competition at the 2016 Summer Olympics in Rio de Janeiro took place at the Rodrigo de Freitas Lagoon. It was held from 8 to 13 August. There were 7 boats (63 competitors) from 7 nations. The event was won by Great Britain, the nation's first victory in the men's eight since 2000 and fourth overall (second to the United States' 12 wins). Defending champions Germany finished with silver this time. The Netherlands earned bronze.

Background

This was the 27th appearance of the event. Rowing had been on the programme in 1896 but was cancelled due to bad weather. The men's eight has been held every time that rowing has been contested, beginning in 1900.

The top two contenders in 2016 were Germany—defending Olympic champion, winner of each European championship since London 2012, and runner-up at each World championship since then—and Great Britain, which had beaten Germany at each of those World championships. Both teams had six men with prior Olympic medals.

For the fourth consecutive Games, no nations made their debut in the event. Five of the seven teams had competed in all four of those Games, at least; Italy had competed in 2004, but New Zealand was making its first appearance since 1984. The United States made its 24th appearance, most among nations to that point.

Qualification

Nations had been limited to one boat each since 1920. The 8 qualifiers were:

 5 boats from the 2015 World Championships
 3 boats from the Final Olympic Qualification Regatta

The Russian boat was excluded due to the Russian doping scandal, leaving only 7 boats to compete.

Competition format

The "eight" event featured nine-person boats, with eight rowers and a coxswain. It was a sweep rowing event, with the rowers each having one oar (and thus each rowing on one side). The course used the 2000 metres distance that became the Olympic standard in 1912 (with the exception of 1948). Races were held in up to six lanes.

The competition consisted of two main rounds (semifinals and finals) as well as a repechage. The competition format was adjusted slightly due to having 7 boats, rather than the typical 8, compete; no "B" final was held.

 Semifinals: Two heats of three or four boats each. The top boat in each heat (2 boats total) advanced directly to the "A" final, while all other boats (5 total) went to the repechage.
 Repechage: A single heat of five boats. The top four boats rejoined the semifinal winners in the "A" final, with the 5th boat eliminated.
 Finals: The "A" final consisted of the top six boats, awarding medals and 4th through 6th place. With only one boat not competing in the "A" final, no "B" final was needed.

Schedule

All times are Brasília Time (UTC−3).

Results

Semifinals

The winners of each heat qualified for the final, while the remainder went to the repechage.

Semifinal 1

Semifinal 2

Repechage

The first four advance to Final A.

Final

References

Men's eight
Men's events at the 2016 Summer Olympics